Donde Quiera Que Estes is the second studio album by Latin rap group Barrio Boyzz. It was released on September 21, 1993 through SBK Records.

Track listing 
"Cerca De Ti" 
"Días Como Hoy"
"Te Amaré"
"America"
"Una Noche De Amor"
"Donde Quiera Que Estés"
"Eres Tú"
"Muy Suavemente"
"Conga"
"Una Noche de Amor"

Barrio Boyzz albums
1993 albums